Calderwood is a village in Amathole District Municipality in the Eastern Cape province of South Africa.

It was named after Henry Calderwood of the London Missionary Society, author of Caffres and Caffre Missions.

References

Populated places in the Raymond Mhlaba Local Municipality